Rachilidis (died 946), was a Benedictine hermit, who lived some time in the 10th century, in what today is modern Switzerland.

Rachilidis spent most of her religious life in the confinement of her cell located close to the monastery of St. Gall, Switzerland, near the cell of Saint Wiborada. She is believed to have died around the year 946.

Notes

Benedictine nuns
10th-century Christian saints
Swiss Roman Catholic religious sisters and nuns
946 deaths
Year of birth unknown